Semi-metro (also known as subway-surface line or hybrid streetcar/lightrail line) is a form of public rail transport in which trams run partly on a conflict-free track, by using tunnels and/or viaducts. Semi-metro lines run with tram cars because they are usually developed from an existing tram network. These stretches of track are designed to function like a regular metro or heavy rail line.

One big difference with metro / heavy rail is that semi-metro lines only partially run in tunnels and/or on viaducts. A metro line does have a completely conflict-free track, often by being completely grade separated. Semi-metro routes are operated by regular trams (with or without low floor) or with specially developed tramcars (light rail vehicles), such as the Stadtbahn-car 'type B'.

Features 
The term semi-metro falls under the umbrella term light rail, which includes many kinds of modern tram transport. Semi-metro is in itself a container concept in which premetro and Stadtbahn fall. Although cheaper than a metro line, the construction of infrastructure for semi-metro routes was often still too expensive. Therefore sections were sometimes not constructed or realised in phases. The entanglement with the existing tram network is an advantage compared to constructing a separate light metro line. Often several tram branches at grade are needed in order to make fully use of the high capacity tunnels.

History 
The first city to carry a portion of a streetcar line through the city center in a tunnel was Marseille, France, in 1893, with its Noailles subterranean station (see Marseille tramway). It was initially operated by horse-drawn wagons. The next prominent example was the Tremont Street subway (1897) in Boston, today part of the MBTA Green Line. Brussels, Cologne and Frankfurt pioneered in Europe in the 1960s.

Subtypes 
Semi-metro networks can be divided into two subtypes. Both terms refer to tram networks where tram vehicles use viaducts and/or run through tunnels under city centres, but with small differences:
Premetro is mostly the same as semi-metro: a type of public transport in which trams run partly grade separated, by using tunnels and/or viaducts. It is usually also developed from an existing classic tram network. However, there is one clear distinguishing factor: premetro uses infrastructure that has been explicitly constructed with the ambition to transfer to use metro trains in the future. One example is the premetro in Brussels, where several premetro lines have been or will be converted into full heavy rail metro lines.
The Stadtbahn is also an intermediate transportation form between metro and tram. It has originated in Germany, adapting the existing tram networks. Here specially developed trams run underground through tunnels in central urban areas. Stadtbahn lines can be subdivided by looking at the types of rolling stock.
There are lines where full-fledged (i.e. 2.65m wide) express trams run, with long wagon bodies: Cologne, Frankfurt and Stuttgart, among others.
There are networks where at the start of operation narrower Stadtbahn trams with shorter wagon bodies were used: Hannover (TW6000) and Bielefeld (Düwag M/N).
From the end of the 20th century Stadtbahn lines with low-floor trams also appeared: Dortmund (U43 & U44), Düsseldorf (Wehrhahnlinie) and Cologne (1, 7, 9, 12 and 15).

Examples 
There are many regions with forms of light rail, but only few where light rail uses tunnels and/or viaducts. In the United States, the systems of San Francisco and Boston are known, furthermore, the networks of Buffalo and Seattle are also counted as semi-metro. Notable examples in Germany are Hannover and Frankfurt although locally called Stadtbahn. A more recent example in Spain is the Madrid Metro Ligero.

References 

Light rail
Tram transport
Rapid transit